Project Twinkle may refer to:

  Project Twinkle, a U.S. Air Force study to investigate the mysterious Green fireballs of the late 1940s
 Project Twinkle (album), an album by King Cobb Steelie